Stonehouse is a British television series dramatising the life and times of disgraced British government minister John Stonehouse, first broadcast from 2 to 4 January 2023. The series starred Matthew Macfadyen and Keeley Hawes and was directed by Jon S. Baird from a script by John Preston.

Synopsis
The series is a part fictional/fact based account of how in November 1974 a prominent Labour British politician, John Stonehouse, the former Postmaster General within the Harold Wilson government and MP for Walsall North, disappeared from the beach of a luxury hotel in Miami, Florida. Stonehouse left only a neatly folded pile of clothes behind, after he swam into the sea to fake his own death. 

Stonehouse had faked his own death in America, in a vain attempt to avoid disgracing his reputation. Following espionage, forgery, theft and fraudulent activities that he had been engaged in, he was extradited back to the UK from Australia.

Cast
 Matthew Macfadyen as John Stonehouse
 Keeley Hawes as Barbara Smith/Stonehouse
 Emer Heatley as Sheila Buckley
 Kevin McNally as Harold Wilson
 Dorothy Atkinson as Betty Boothroyd
 Orla Hill as Jane Stonehouse
 Aoife Checkland as Julia Stonehouse
 Archie Barnes as Matthew Stonehouse
 Will Adamsdale as Harry Evans
 Igor Grabuzov as Alexander Marek
 Devon Black as Margaret Thatcher
 Ieva Andrejevaite as Irena Bala
 Timothy Walker as Charles Elwell

Production
Filming took place around Birmingham and Stratford-upon-Avon. The series marked the first time real life husband and wife Macfadyen and Hawes have worked together since the BBC series Ashes to Ashes. Kevin McNally has previously appeared as Harold Wilson in the Kray twins 2015 bio-pic Legend, starring Tom Hardy.

Broadcast
Stonehouse was broadcast in the UK on ITV1 and ITVX in three one-hour episodes on 2, 3 and 4 January 2023 from 9pm.

Reception
Rebecca Nicholson of The Guardian awarded the drama four stars out of five, and called it "enormously entertaining". Carol Midgley of The Times described it as "a joy, chiefly thanks to Macfadyen’s witty, light-on-its-feet performance," whilst Hugo Rifkind, writing for the same newspaper, declared it "very funny" but was disappointed in the lack of nuance in its depiction of the title character.

References

External links
 

Television shows filmed in the United Kingdom
Television shows filmed in England
Television shows set in the West Midlands (county)
Television shows set in Warwickshire
2023 British television series debuts
2023 British television series endings
2020s British crime drama television series
2020s British television miniseries
ITV television dramas
English-language television shows
Television series by ITV Studios